SX-3228 is a sedative and hypnotic drug used in scientific research. It has similar effects to sedative-hypnotic benzodiazepine drugs, but is structurally distinct and so is classed as a nonbenzodiazepine hypnotic.

SX-3228 is a subtype-selective GABAA positive allosteric modulator acting primarily at the α1 subtype. It thus has similar effects to other α1-selective drugs such as zolpidem and zaleplon in animal studies. It only partly substitutes for ethanol, and is a strong sedative-hypnotic with only limited anxiolytic effects which appear only at doses that also produce significant sedation.

References 

GABAA receptor positive allosteric modulators
Sedatives
Lactams
Oxadiazoles
Ethers
Naphthyridines